Fish stock or stock fish may also refer to:
Fish stocks are subpopulations of a particular species of fish.
 Fish stock (food), liquid made by boiling fish bones with vegetables, used as a base for fish soups and sauces
 Fish stocking, the practice of raising fish in a hatchery and releasing them into a river, lake, or ocean
 Stockfish, unsalted fish, especially cod, dried by cold air
 Stockfish (chess), an open source UCI chess engine